Rubel may refer to:

People

Surname 
 Ahmed Rubel (born 1969), Bangladeshi actor
 Aleksandr Rubel (born 1980), Estonian murderer
 Alexander Rubel (born 1969), German-Romanian historian
 Donald C. Rubel (1900–1980), American banker and politician
 Edwin Rubel, American otolaryngologist
 Ilana Rubel (born 1972), American politician
 Ira Rubel, inventor of offset printing
 Jane Rubel, basketballer and postal worker
 John H. Rubel (1920–2015), American business executive and public official
 Lee Albert Rubel (1928–1995), American mathematician
 Mahmudul Haque Rubel, Bangladesh politician
 Masum Parvez Rubel (born 1960), Bangladeshi actor, director, producer, and director
 Matthew Rubel (born 1957), American businessman
 Maximilien Rubel (1905–1996), Soviet-born French Marxist
 Robert J. Rubel (born 1946), American author
 Robert Rubel, American football coach
 Samuel Rubel (1881–1949), Russian-born American businessman
 Steve Rubel, American public relations executive and blogger
 Tahounia Rubel (born 1988), Ethiopian-born Israeli fashion model and television personality
 Talia Rubel (born 1979), American actress
 Vadym Rubel (born 1966), Ukrainian historian

Given name 
 Rubel Ahmed (1980s–2014), Bangladeshi immigrant to Britain, who died in an immigration detention centre under controverted circumstances
 Rubel Ahmed (cricketer), Bangladeshi cricketer
 Rubel Das, Indian actor
 Rubel Hossain (born 1990), Bangladeshi cricketer
 Rubel Mia (born 1992), Bangladeshi cricketer
 Rubel Miya (born 1995), Bangladeshi footballer
 Rubel Phillips, American politician
 Rubel Rana (born 1983), Bangladeshi swimmer
 Rubel Rana (born 1983), Bangladeshi swimmer
 Rubel Sarsour (born 1983), Arab-Israeli footballer
 Rubel Shelly, author, minister, and professor

Nickname 
 Mosaddek Hossain (cricketer, born 1983), also known as Rubel

Other uses 
 Belarusian rubel, the currency of Belarus
 Rubel Castle, in Glendora, California

See also 
 Karl Rübel (1895–1945), German army general